Factoría de Ficción is a Spanish free-to-air television network owned by Mediaset España. It was launched on 18 February 2008 as FDF Telecinco, replacing Telecinco Estrellas. On 25 July 2009 it changed its logo and name only to "Factoría de Ficción" (Spanish for factory of fiction). It is a 24-hour channel and airs both syndicated and original television series and films. It is available on free-to-air digital television, and cable television.

Programming 
Factoría de Ficcion airs syndicated television series, both international and local, most of them reruns of series previously aired on sister channels Cuatro and Telecinco.

Foreign series 
Friends
Cheers
Mira, Royal Detective
Family Matters
Growing Pains
Boj
Everybody Hates Chris
Perfect Strangers
Claude
Rules of Engagement
Relic Hunter
Tulli
Full House
Small Talk
Medium
ER
Esme & Roy
Ghost Whisperer
Castle
Franny's Feet
CSI: Crime Scene Investigation
CSI: Miami
CSI: NY
Lightning Point
NCIS: Los Angeles
Cold Case
Supah Ninjas
Criminal Minds
Criminal Minds: Suspect Behavior
Zigby
House
Spartacus: Blood and Sand
Pierre the Painter
Hawaii Five-0
The Defenders
Zoe Wants to Be
Monk
The Closer
Mona & Sketch
Royal Pains
Grandpa's Gallery
Lost
Psych
Yo Gabba Gabba!
White Collar
Sally Bollywood
Falling Skies
The Kill Point
Henry Hugglemonster

Local series 
Aída
Saari
El Comisario
Sponk!
Hospital Central
Postman Pat
La que se avecina
Los Serrano
Doug
La pecera de Eva
Sota Caballo y Rey
Punta Escarlata
Homicidios
The Powerpuff Girls
The Powerpuff Girls
Cheers
Tierra de Lobos
7 Vidas
World of Polli
La hora de José Mota

References

External links
 Official site

Channels of Mediaset España Comunicación
Television stations in Spain
Television channels and stations established in 2008
Spanish-language television stations